Venus, in comics, may refer to:

 Venus (Marvel Comics), two Marvel Comics character, a siren pretending to be the goddess and the goddess, going by Aphrodite
 Venus (comic book), a romance comic from 1948 which introduced the above character

See also
Venus (disambiguation)
Aphrodite (comics), the Greek name for the same (or similar) deity